Voltage-dependent L-type calcium channel subunit beta-2 is a protein that in humans is encoded by the CACNB2 gene.

Clinical significance 

Mutation in the CACNB2 gene are  associated with Brugada syndrome, autism, attention deficit-hyperactivity disorder (ADHD), bipolar disorder, major depressive disorder, and schizophrenia.

See also
 Voltage-dependent calcium channel

References

Further reading

External links
  GeneReviews/NIH/NCBI/UW entry on Brugada syndrome
 
 

Ion channels